Beautiful is a 2011 Indian Malayalam musical drama film written by Anoop Menon and directed by V. K. Prakash. The film stars Jayasurya, Anoop Menon and Meghana Raj in the lead roles. The cinematography was by Jomon T. John and the music was composed by Ratheesh Vegha. It tells the story about the intense bonding of two friends, one quadriplegic and the other a musician. The film released on 2 December 2011 to predominantly positive reviews and was a commercial success.

Plot
Stephen Louis (Jayasurya) is a quadriplegic by birth who is immensely rich, and believes in celebrating each moment of life. Despite being able to move only his neck, he loves to see beautiful things and aspires to celebrate life. He is assisted by his Manager Kamalu (Nandu) and his caretaker/driver Karunan (Jayan) in a palatial house in Fort Kochi. As most of his relatives look to take advantage of his position, Louis has kept all of them at bay, barring his cousin brother Alex (Tini Tom) with whom he shares a good relationship.

John (Anoop Menon), a musician at a hotel, enters his life. John is completely opposite from Stephen's nature. He is always worried about the future. Though poles apart in their attitudes, both enjoy a good friendship and try to make each other happy. During this, they realize that they were childhood friends. But with the arrival of a beautiful home nurse named Anjali (Meghana Raj), the attitudes of both friends towards their lives turn around. The movie takes unexpected twists and turns and Anjali finally turns out to be Alex's mistress. Her real name is Annie. She had come to Louis's residence undercover to poison him and to steal him off his wealth, with Alex, who had taken advantage of Louis' openness with him, in on the vicious ploy. Unfortunately, John, who last visited Louis before his poisoning, was blamed. But after the police take John away,  Alex's maid recognizes him and Anjali at the hospital, in which Louis was dying of poisoning. The police let go off John and arrest Alex and Anjali. Surprisingly, on a good note, Louis survives and the friends live together happily.

Cast
 Jayasurya as Stephen Louis, a quadriplegic.
 Anoop Menon as John, a musician.
 Meghana Raj as Anjali/Annie.
Nandhu as Kamalu
 Jayan Cherthala as Karunan, the driver.
 Tini Tom as Alex Malaickal
 Unni Menon as Peter
 P. Balachandran as Advocate Chandy
 Aparna Nair as Meera
 Ammu Venugopal as John's sister
 Praveena as Doctor
 Thesni Khan as Kanyaka
 Kishore Kumar as Biju, Alex's friend
 Kochu Preman as Kunjachan, Alex's uncle
 Ponnamma Babu as Nancy, Alex's aunt
 Joju George
 Pauly Valsan
 Lishoy as Louis Varghese, Stephen's father
 Master Dhananjay as Stephen (as childhood)

Production
Anoop Menon says the film was inspired by a real life incident, the persisting memory of his quadriplegic childhood friend. The film started its shooting in Kochi in September 2011. Other main Location was in Munnar.The film was first titled as "Ladies and Gentlemen" and was later changed to "Beautiful". It has been produced by Anand Kumar under the banner of Yes Cinema.

Moral anarchy is the religion of the film's characters as they come out with volatile statements regarding marriage and loyalty. The casual reference to marital infidelity mouthed by Praveena's character in the film has irked many, but Anoop insists that he was just being realistic while penning the lines. "Even the films that come under the realistic tag hardly handle such subjects in honest and transparent manner. We camouflage the reality with flashy elements so that you don’t have to confront it openly. All my women characters are bold and I believe today’s women are daring enough to discuss such stuff," he says.

Beautiful was a turning point in Meghana Raj's career. Although she herself was Prakash's first choice for the role, she was approached only four days before the shooting started. The actress says: "I was approached four days before the shoot. I absolutely fell in love with the bad girl role. I never dreamt that I could carry off the role and the entire credit goes to my director V.K Prakash. I remember coming for the shoot with makeup and groomed hair and being very politely told to remove my makeup and oil my hair by VKP. I was asked to bring all my bindis, out of which one was selected to be my only makeup in the film." Meghana admits that it was challenging to achieve the right amount of underplayed sensuality, which was part of the character of Anjali, who conveys a lot through her eyes and body language.

Major portion of the movie was filmed from Bastion Bungalow in Fort Kochi, Kerala.

Soundtrack

The film's songs and background score were composed by Ratheesh Vegha and arranged by Gopi Sundar. Parvathy S. Nair from The Times of India stated, "Ratheesh Vega has done it again. After he pulled at the heart strings of music lovers with Cocktail a year ago, the music maker has repeated the magic with the songs and background score of director V K Prakash's Beautiful."

Beautiful was Anoop Menon's debut work as a lyricist. Menon says his debut as a lyricist was quite accidental. "On the second day of the shooting of Beautiful, music director Ratheesh Vega, actor Jayasurya, and I were chilling out in Ratheesh's car, when he asked me to pen some lines to try out a tune he'd composed for the film. The result is Mazhaneer Thullikal...," says the actor.

Release 
The film was originally scheduled to release on 18 November but was pushed back to 2 December due to a strike in the Malayalam film industry. it is the remake of Hollywood movie The Intouchables. It opened in 46 centres inside Kerala on 2 December. The film had its international premiere at the first Ladakh International Film Festival (LIFF) where it was one of the two Malayalam features to be screened.

Reception

Paresh C. Palicha of Rediff.com rated the film 3.5/5 and stated: "V K Prakash-directed Beautiful can be considered a significant milestone in the revival of Malayalam cinema." Veeyen of Nowrunning.com gave the film 3/5 and said: "V K Prakash's 'Beautiful' is a compelling evocation of the human desire dynamics at work." the site added that "Beautiful wouldn't call it a masterpiece, but it is without doubt, one of the most absorbing Malayalam films that I have seen this year." A critic from IndiaGlitz.com rated the film 3.25/5 and wrote: "On the whole, 'Beautiful' has a fresh, honest and unpretentious air to it, which makes it appealing. Played with subtlety and intelligence by its stars, the movie is sure to end up in the lists of the bests of the year. Rightly advised for a must and decent watch."Sify.com gave a rating of 3.5/5 stating, "Beautiful has its own flaws and is far from perfect but needs to be appreciated for its courage to experiment. It could have been better and the jokes and the stance on morality may not find acceptance from all, but this one has sincerity written all over it. Now, the decision is all yours!" Kerala9.com gave a (3/5) and commented, "Beautiful is a cool clean film. Malayalam has got a director who understands what subtlety is."

Box office
The film was a commercial success.

Awards
1st South Indian International Movie Awards 
 SIIMA Award for Best Lyricist - Anoop Menon for "Mazhaneerthullikal"

Film Guidance Society of Kerala Film Awards
 Best Film
 Best Actor - Jayasurya
 Best Scriptwriter - Anoop Menon
 Best Music Director - Ratheesh Vegha
 Best Singer - Unni Menon

 Ramu Kariat Memorial Cultural Forum Awards
 Special Jury Award - Jayasurya

 Thikkurissi Foundation Awards (2012)
 Second Best Actor - Jayasurya
 Best Script - Anoop Menon
 Best Cinematography - Jomon T. John

 Nana Film Awards
 Best Actor - Jayasurya

 Amrita TV Film Awards
 Entertainer of the Year - Jayasurya

References

 https://archive.today/20121130101548/http://cinemalablog.blogspot.com/2012/01/malayalam-movie-beautiful-inspired-from.html

External links
 Official website
 
 Beautiful at Malayalam Movie Database

2011 films
2010s Malayalam-language films
2010s musical drama films
2011 thriller drama films
Indian musical drama films
Indian thriller drama films
Films about disability in India
Films with screenplays by Anoop Menon
Films directed by V. K. Prakash
2011 drama films